The Challenger Città di Lugano, also known as Challenger BancaStato Città di Lugano for sponsorship reasons, is a professional tennis tournament played on indoor hard courts. It is currently part of the Association of Tennis Professionals (ATP) Challenger Tour. It is held annually in Lugano, Switzerland. It is organized by Riccardo Margaroli.

Past finals

Singles

Doubles

References

External links
Website on the ATP Challenger Tour

ATP Challenger Tour
Hard court tennis tournaments
Tennis tournaments in Switzerland
Recurring sporting events established in 2021